Holland Township is an inactive township in Pemiscot County, in the U.S. state of Missouri.

Holland Township takes its name from the community of Holland, Missouri.

References

Townships in Missouri
Townships in Pemiscot County, Missouri